Tibetodus is an extinct genus of prehistoric ray-finned fish that lived during the Late Jurassic epoch.

See also

 Prehistoric fish
 List of prehistoric bony fish

References

Pycnodontiformes genera
Late Jurassic fish
Jurassic fish of Asia